Pseudochrysops is a genus of butterflies in the family Lycaenidae. This genus is monotypic, consisting of only one species, Pseudochrysops bornoi, which is found on Haiti, Puerto Rico and Cuba.

Subspecies
Pseudochrysops bornoi bornoi (Haiti)
Pseudochrysops bornoi ecobioi Schwartz, 1987 (Puerto Rico)
Pseudochrysops bornoi yateritas Smith & Hernández, 1992 (Cuba)

References

Polyommatini
Butterflies of the Caribbean
Butterflies of Cuba
Arthropods of Puerto Rico
Fauna of Haiti
Fauna of Hispaniola
Monotypic butterfly genera
Lycaenidae genera